This is the discography of the Japanese pop singer Hitomi.

Albums

Studio albums

Mini albums

Compilation albums

Singles

As lead artist

DVDs
 Nine Clips - March 29, 2000
 Nine Clips 2 - March 7, 2001
 Live Tour 2001 Love Life - August 22, 2001
 Purasu (Nine Clips + Nine Clips 2) - March 13, 2002
 Hitomi Live Tour 2002 Huma-rhythm - September 4, 2002
 Frozen in Time - December 4, 2002
 Hitomi Live Tour 2004 Traveler - September 29, 2004
 Hitomi Live Tour 2002 Huma-rhythm - December 8, 2004 (low priced version)
 Hitomi 2005 10th Anniversary Live Thank You - June 1, 2005
 Hitomi Japanese Girl Collection 2005: Love Music, Love Fashion - November 23, 2005
 Hitomi Live Tour 2005 “Love Angel” - March 29, 2006
 Peace - December 5, 2007

References

Discographies of Japanese artists
Pop music discographies

fr:Hitomi#Discographie